Six vessels of the Royal Navy have borne the name  HMS (or HMY) Royal Charlotte, after Charlotte of Mecklenburg-Strelitz, consort of King George III.

 HMY Royal Charlotte was the royal yacht , launched in 1750, renamed in 1761, and broken up in 1820.
  was a 10-gun sloop built at Navy Island and launched in 1764 for service principally on Lake Huron for the Provincial Marine, and in service until 1772.
  was a 14-gun French privateer of 520 tons that the 14-gun brig-sloop  and the 10-gun cutter  captured on 15 September 1780, and that the Royal Navy used as a transport until 10 April 1783 when she was sold at Milford. 
  was a 6-gun yacht launched in 1824 and broken up in 1832.
 ML 6024 and ML 6028 were ex-German vessels that the Royal Navy used between 1949 and 1958 and named Royal Charlotte

HM Excise and Customs
 Royal Charlotte, brig, in the service of the Honourable Commissioners for Excise of Scotland. This vessel is variously described as being of 246 tons (bm), and 204 tons (bm). She is mentioned in 1780 as being under Commander Duncan Aire, and having a crew of some 32 men. In 1789, a Charles Elder was appointed captain of the excise cutter Royal Charlotte on Aire's death on board while at Cromarty Bay. With the outbreak of war, the brig Royal Charlotte, Captain Charles Elder, 60 men, 14 x 9 & 6-pounder guns + 4 x 18-pounder carronades + 6 swivel guns, received a letter of marque dated 15 April 1793. That month the revenue cutter Royal Charlotte captured and sent into Leith the French 6-gun privateer Republicain, of 37 men. In 1797, Royal Charlotte escorted into Leith a large Spanish merchant brig, prize to the privateer Breadalbane. With the resumption of war in 1803, Royal Charlotte received a new letter of marque, this one dated 6 July 1803. Her captain was still Charles Elder, but her armament was now 10 x 6-pounder guns. 
 Royal Charlotte, ship of 392 tons, Captain Andrew Ramsey, 35 men, 16 x 12-pounder guns, received a letter of marque dated 15 October 1810.

HM hired ships
References exist to hired armed vessels serving the Royal Navy.
 Hired armed ship Royal Charlotte, of 20 guns, was at the Battle of Porto Praya in 1781, where she had one man killed and four wounded. Earlier, she had served as part of the squadron defending Jersey.
 Royal Charlotte (Transport) - was at Montevideo in 1806 as part of Sir Home Riggs Popham's invasion of the Rio de la Plata. She was lost during a gale on 10 March 1807.

Shore establishment
There were two Royal Navy wireless stations doing SIGINT work in West Germany after World War II, HMS Royal Albert at Cuxhaven, early 1950s, and HMS Royal Charlotte at Kiel, later 1950s.

See also

Citations

References
 
Commons, House of, Great Britain (1802) History of the proceedings and debates of the House of Commons. (Printed for J. Almon).
 Grant, James (1880) Cassell's old and new Edinburgh.
 Mahan, Alfred Thayer (1898) Major Operations of the Royal Navy, 1762-1783: Being Chapter XXXI. in The Royal Navy. A History. (Little, Brown).
 Malcomson, Robert (2001) Warships of the Great Lakes 1754-1834. (Annapolis: Naval Institute Press).  
 Marx, robert F. (1987) Shipwrecks in the Americas. (Courier Dover Publications). 
 Norie, J. W. (1842) The naval gazetteer, biographer and chronologist; containing a history of the late wars from ... 1793 to ... 1801; and from ... 1803 to 1815, and continued, as to the biographical part to the present time. (London, C. Wilson).
 Smith, Graham (1983) King's cutters: the Revenue Service and the war against smuggling. (Conway Maritime Press). 

Royal Navy ship names